Charles Pendleton may refer to:

 Charles F. Pendleton (1931–1953), U.S. Army soldier and Medal of Honor recipient
 Charles S. Pendleton (1880–1952), American politician in Virginia